Gordon S. Marshall (1919 – June 2, 2015) was an American businessman and philanthropist. He was the founder of Marshall Industries, a publicly traded company from 1984 to 1999. Gordon S. Marshall died on June 2, 2015 at the age of 95.

Early life
Gordon S. Marshall was born in Los Angeles, California in 1919. He graduated from the University of Southern California in 1946. He served as a bomber pilot for the United States in World War II.  He was an amateur radio operator (call sign W6RR (ex-W6ITA)) and credited amateur radio with leading him into his successful career in electronics.

Career
Marshall founded his namesake company Marshall Industries, headquartered in El Monte, California, in 1982. He served as its President from April 1982 to June 1992, and as its Chief Executive Officer until 1994. The company became one of the nation's five largest distributors of industrial electronic components and production supplies. In 1999, it was acquired by Avnet.

He served on the board of directors of the Amistar Corporation (OTCMKTS:AMTA) from 1974.

Philanthropy
Marshall served on the board of trustees of the University of Southern California. He donated US$35 million to USC in 1997. The USC Marshall School of Business is named in his memory.

References

1919 births
2015 deaths
People from Los Angeles
University of Southern California alumni
United States Army Air Forces bomber pilots of World War II
American company founders
Businesspeople from California
American chief executives
Philanthropists from California
Amateur radio people
20th-century American businesspeople
20th-century American philanthropists
Military personnel from California